Incidental(s) may refer to:

Incidentals, incidental expenses
Incidentals (album)

See also
Incidental music